Chrzczony  is a village in the administrative district of Gmina Troszyn, within Ostrołęka County, Masovian Voivodeship, in east-central Poland.

References

Villages in Ostrołęka County